The King Is Dead! is a 2012 Australian comedy drama thriller film directed by Rolf de Heer about a young couple who are tormented by the neighbour from hell.

Plot
Max (Dan Wyllie) and Therese (Bojana Novakovic) have just moved into a new house, unfortunately they are now next door to a strange man named King (Gary Waddell). At first, things seem to go smoothly until King and his friends become trouble with Max and Therese and they both suspect he may be a drug dealer, so Max and Therese concoct a plan to have King move out of their neighbourhood.

Cast
Dan Wyllie as Max
Bojana Novakovic as Therese
Gary Waddell as King
Luke Ford as Shrek
Anthony Hayes as Escobar

Production
Forty percent of the budget came from Screen Australia with additional investment from the South Australian Film Corp, Pinnacle, the sales agent Fandango Portobello International, and Chinese investor Bruno Wu's Locus Global Entertainment.

Accolades

References

External links
The King Is Dead at At the Movies

Review at The Hollywood Reporter

Australian thriller films
Films directed by Rolf de Heer
2012 films
2010s English-language films
Australian comedy-drama films
2010s Australian films